Kishan Sami (born 13 March 2000) is a Fijian footballer who plays as a right back for Fiji Premier League club Rewa and the Fiji national team.

Club career
Sami started his career in the youth of Ba. In 2017 he made his debut for the first team. Soon after making his debut, Sami became a regular in the first 11. In 2018 he played all 3 matches in Ba's disappointing 2018 OFC Champions League campaign.

On 1 February 2020, Rakula went on a trial at Manukau United FC in New Zealand together with his teammate from Ba F.C. and the national team, Malakai Rakula. Both players signed a one-year deal with the club on 10 February 2020. They made their debut together on 13 March 2020 in a friendly match.

National team
In 2018 Sami was called up by coach Christophe Gamel for the Fiji national football team. He made his debut on March 22, 2018, in a 3–2 loss against the Philippines. He came in for Narendra Rao in the 69th minute of play. 
In 2019, he was selected for the 2019 Pacific Games. Fiji won a bronze medal.

International goals
Scores and results list Fiji's goal tally first.

References

Fijian footballers
Fijian expatriate footballers
Association football defenders
Ba F.C. players
Fiji international footballers
Living people
Fijian people of Indian descent
2000 births
Expatriate association footballers in New Zealand